The 1956 Princeton Tigers football team was an American football team that represented Princeton University as a member of the Ivy League during the 1956 NCAA University Division football season. 

In their 12th and final year under head coach Charlie Caldwell, the Tigers compiled a 7–2 record and outscored opponents 237 to 135. Michael E. Bowman was the team captain.

After starting the year 7–0, Princeton briefly appeared as No. 20 in the AP Poll, but only remained ranked for one week.

Princeton's 5–2 conference record secured second place in the Ivy League standings. This was the first season of formal play for the league, although the Tigers' previous  independent schedules, dating back to the 19th century, often featured future Ivy opponents. All seven Ivy matchups on Princeton's 1956 schedule had been present on the 1955 slate, as well (as had both non-conference opponents, Colgate and Rutgers).

Princeton played its home games at Palmer Stadium on the university campus in Princeton, New Jersey.

Schedule

References

Princeton
Princeton Tigers football seasons
Princeton Tigers football